The 2021 NCAA Division I men's ice hockey tournament was the national championship tournament for men's college ice hockey in the United States, scheduled for March 26–April 10, 2021. The tournament involved 16 teams in single-elimination play to determine the national champion at the Division I level of the National Collegiate Athletic Association (NCAA), the highest level of competition in college hockey. The first two rounds took place at four regional sites on March 26–28, and the tournament's Frozen Four – the semifinals and finals – was hosted by Robert Morris University at the PPG Paints Arena in Pittsburgh from April 8 to 10.

The SNHU Arena in Manchester, New Hampshire was selected to host the Northeast Region, but pulled out on January 26, 2021, due to concerns over the COVID-19 pandemic. The Times Union Center in Albany, New York was selected as a replacement site.

This year's tournament featured, as of 2022, the longest game in NCAA Division I men's ice hockey tournament history, when the Minnesota Duluth Bulldogs defeated the North Dakota Fighting Hawks by a score of 3–2 in five overtimes, totaling 142:13 minutes of play, in the West Regional Final.

This tournament's Frozen Four teams were also notable for a number of reasons. First, it was just the second time in NCAA Division I men's ice hockey tournament history in which three of the final four teams came from one state. This first occurred in 1992, when the Michigan Wolverines, Michigan State Spartans, and Lake Superior State Lakers, all from Michigan, made the Frozen Four. In this year’s tournament, three teams came from Minnesota, these teams being the Minnesota Duluth Bulldogs, St. Cloud State Huskies, and Minnesota State Mavericks. Also, this year's tournament was only the third time since 1992, when Regional Tournaments were first conducted, that no teams ranked no. 1 in their respective Regional Tournament advanced to the Frozen Four. This also occurred in the 1998 and 2007 tournaments.

Tournament procedure

The tournament is composed of four groups of four teams in regional brackets. The four regionals are officially named after their geographic areas.

Regional semifinals and finals
 March 26–27
 East Regional, Webster Bank Arena – Bridgeport, Connecticut (Hosts: Sacred Heart and Yale)
 Midwest Regional, Scheels Arena – Fargo, North Dakota (Host: North Dakota) 
 March 27–28 
 Northeast Regional, Times Union Center – Albany, New York (Hosts: ECAC)
 West Regional, Budweiser Events Center – Loveland, Colorado (Host: Denver) 

National semifinals and championship (Frozen Four and championship)
 April 8 and April 10
 PPG Paints Arena – Pittsburgh, Pennsylvania (Host: Robert Morris University)

Qualifying teams

The at-large bids and seeding for each team in the tournament were announced on March 21, 2021.

Typically, teams are seeded according to their PairWise rankings (PWR); however, due to the COVID-19 pandemic causing a severe lack of inter-conference games among the league, using the PWR would not be a reliable representation of overall NCAA standings. As a result, the NCAA Selection Committee awarded seeds manually based on varying factors, including perceived strength of conference and performance against the best teams in conference. Once seeds were determined, matchups were adjusted to prevent teams from the same conference meeting in the first round, as well as minimize the amount of traveling required due to the pandemic. 

The NCHC and Big Ten each had four teams receive a berth in the tournament, Hockey East and WCHA each had three teams receive a berth, and one team from Atlantic Hockey and the ECAC each received a berth.

ECAC Tournament champions St. Lawrence earned an autobid but were forced to withdraw from the tournament as a result of a positive COVID-19 test among the team's coaching staff.  Quinnipiac was selected to replace St. Lawrence as ECAC's autobid.

On March 25, it was announced that Notre Dame would be forced to withdraw from the tournament due to COVID protocols. As a result, their matchup with Boston College was ruled a no-contest and the Eagles automatically advanced to the Northeast Regional Final. Similarly, on March 26, the NCAA announced Michigan was forced to withdraw as well due to COVID protocols. As a result, Minnesota–Duluth automatically advanced to the Midwest Regional Final. 

Number in parentheses denotes overall seed in the tournament.

Tournament bracket 

* denotes overtime period† Michigan and Notre Dame were removed from the tournament due to positive COVID-19 test results.

Results

Midwest Region – Fargo, North Dakota

Regional semifinals

Regional Final

Northeast Region – Albany, New York

Regional semifinals

Regional Final

West Region – Loveland, Colorado

Regional semifinals

Regional Final

East Region – Bridgeport, Connecticut

Regional semifinals

Regional Final

Frozen Four – Pittsburgh, Pennsylvania

National semifinal

2021 National Championship

(E2) Massachusetts vs. (NE2) St. Cloud State

All-Tournament team
G: Filip Lindberg (Massachusetts)
D: Zac Jones (Massachusetts)
D: Matthew Kessel (Massachusetts)
F: Nathan Smith (Minnesota State)
F: Bobby Trivigno* (Massachusetts)
F: Nolan Walker (St. Cloud State)
* Most Outstanding Player(s)

Record by conference

Note: Two regional semifinal games were declared 'No Contest' and the four teams involved were not credited with a win or a loss in those games.

Media

Television
ESPN had US television rights to all games during the tournament for the sixteenth consecutive year. ESPN aired every game, beginning with the regionals, on ESPN, ESPN2, ESPNews, ESPNU, and ESPN3, which were streamed online via WatchESPN.

Broadcast assignments
Regionals
East Regional: John Buccigross, Barry Melrose, and Colby Cohen – Bridgeport, Connecticut
Midwest Regional: Leah Hextall and Dave Starman – Fargo, North Dakota
Northeast Regional: Kevin Brown and Sean Ritchlin – Albany, New York
West Regional: Ben Holden and Fred Pletsch – Loveland, Colorado

Frozen Four
 John Buccigross, Barry Melrose, Colby Cohen, and Quint Kessenich – Pittsburgh, Pennsylvania

Radio
Westwood One had exclusive radio rights to the Frozen Four and broadcast both the semifinals and the championship.
 Brian Tripp and Dave Starman

References

 

 
NCAA Division I men's ice hockey tournament
NCAA Division I men's ice hockey tournament
NCAA Division I men's ice hockey tournament
NCAA Division I men's ice hockey tournament
NCAA Division I men's ice hockey tournament
NCAA Division I men's ice hockey tournament
NCAA Division I men's ice hockey tournament
NCAA Division I men's ice hockey tournament
2020s in Pittsburgh
Ice hockey competitions in Denver
Ice hockey competitions in North Dakota
Ice hockey competitions in Pittsburgh
Ice hockey competitions in Albany, New York
Ice hockey competitions in Bridgeport, Connecticut
Sports in Fargo, North Dakota
Loveland, Colorado